The 1917–18 Idaho Vandals men's basketball team represented the University of Idaho during the  college basketball season. The Vandals were led by second-year head coach  and played their home games on campus at the  Armory and Gymnasium in Moscow, Idaho.

The Vandals were  overall. Due to World War I, freshmen were allowed to play varsity sports and the Vandals had five in the starting lineup.

This was the final year at Idaho for alumnus Edmundson, a Moscow native (and an Olympian in track in 1912).  He coached at Washington in Seattle for decades, starting in 1920.

References

External links
Sports Reference – Idaho Vandals: 1917–18 basketball season
Gem of the Mountains: 1919 (spring 1918) University of Idaho yearbook – 1917–18 basketball season
Idaho Argonaut – student newspaper – 1918 editions

Idaho Vandals men's basketball seasons
Idaho
Idaho
Idaho